The Munji language, also known as Munjani, Munjhan, and the Munjiwar language, is a Pamir language spoken in Munjan valley in Badakhshan Province in northeast Afghanistan. It is similar to the Yidgha language, which is spoken in the Upper Lotkoh Valley of Chitral, west of Garam Chashma in Khyber Pakhtunkhwa, Pakistan.

Historically, Munji displays the closest possible linguistic affinity with the now-extinct Bactrian language.

The Garam Chashma area became important during the Soviet–Afghan War. During the invasion, the Soviets were unable to stop the flow of arms and men back and forth across the Dorah Pass that separates Chitral, in Pakistan, from Badakshan in Afghanistan. The two dialects spoken in the area of Mamalgha Valley and the area of Munjan Valley differed, being the northern and southern dialects. The language has moved to parts of Chitral, after the War in Afghanistan forced the Munji-speaking people to flee to safer areas.

Despite Dari being the predominant language of the region, attitudes towards Munji are highly positive, and among speakers, few predict a decline in use.

Phonology

Orthography 
Zabanha is one of the major language revival organisations of northern Afghanistan and has created an alphabet for Munji.

References

Further reading

 
 

Pamir languages of Afghanistan
Pamir languages
Endangered Iranian languages